Henry Meade Williams (May 1, 1899–April 24, 1984) was an American writer, editor, publisher, and bookstore owner in Carmel-by-the-Sea, California. The Henry Meade Williams Local History Room of the Harrison Memorial Library honors his name.

Early life 

Williams was born on May 1, 1899, in New York City, New York. His father was author and dramatist Jesse Lynch Williams (1871-1929), who won the first Pulitzer Prize for Drama for his play Why Marry? in 1917. His mother was Alice Laidlaw (1872-1960). He was raised in a literary atmosphere in Princeton, New Jersey. 

His father came to Carmel-by-the-Sea, California in 1907, at the suggestion of photographer Arnold Genthe. Much of his novel, They Still Fall in Love, was written there and several of scenes in the book are familiar area of the Monterey Peninsula. 

During World War I Williams enlisted in the United States Navy at the age of 17 and was stationed at New London, Connecticut State Pier. After the war he went to Texas to work in the oil fields as a driller for a year. He then walked from New York to Santa Barbara, where he worked for a shoe store and advertised the boots he wore to walk across the country. In 1922, he was a Freshman at Princeton University in New Jersey.

Williams's first marriage was to Mary McIntosh on March 10, 1923, in New York City. They came to Carmel-by-the-Sea in April 1923 to live for a time the "Firefly," on Carmelo Street. His second marriage was to novelist Vermona March "Mona" Goodwyn on December 24, 1929, in Greenwich, Connecticut. They had three children during their marriage. They lived in Princeton, N.J.

Professional background
Williams literary career began in New York, with an executive post with Sears Publishing Company. He then became a features editor of The American Magazine. He was author of more than 150 short stories, which appeared in The Saturday Evening Post, and other leading magazines.

In 1925, he wrote the story Tides about the rocky coast of Maine. In 1927, he wrote an illustrated  book Robin Hood. While working for the American Magazine, he wrote Victory, a short story that appeared in the  Vanity Fair in October 1935. 

In 1936, during the Great Depression in the United States, Williams moved with his family to Carmel-by-the-Sea, California, where he and his wife continued their writing careers. His wife Mona, wrote several books, including: Here are my children, (1932), Bright is the morning, (1935) Dream pictures, (1952) The Hot Breath of Heaven." (1961), and others. 

Williams bought the Wells' Bookshop, on Ocean Avenue between San Carlos and Dolores Streets, in 1956 from Col. Joseph Wells. He carried classic and current books. He continued to run this business until 1968. The book store moved into the old Carmel Bank building on Mission and Dolores Streets that was once the home of Barnet J. Segal's Carmel Investment Company in the 1940s.

Williams served as a member of the Friends of the Harrison Memorial Library (FHML) and became president. The purpose of FHML is "to promote and encourage the Harrison Library and build a close relationship between the library and the community."

Death

Williams died on April 24, 1984, at Community Hospital of the Monterey Peninsula in Monterey, California, at the age of 84. A memorial service took place on April 28th at the family home in Carmel-by-the-Sea, California with his family and friends. He was cremated at Mission Mortuary funeral home in Monterey.

Legacy

The Henry Meade Williams Local History Room is part of the Harrison Memorial Library that honors his name. Established in 1989, it is located at the Park Branch Library at Mission Street and 6th Avenue in Carmel-by-the-Sea. The history room preserves collections of manuscripts, personal papers, photographs, and books relating to Carmel's history. It serves 14,000 registered users with a collection of 6,000 photographs, 2,000 books and letters, diaries, manusciprts, maps, and scrapbooks. The branch has Local History and Youth Services Departments. The history room's main space includes window and table seating, bookcases, and access to the inner vault and trained archivists.

In 1889, Architect William Foster remodeled the old Crocker Bank to house the Henry Meade Williams Local History Department. The former bank vault now holds the old manuscripts and photographs of Carmel-by-the-Sea. The Henry Meade Williams Local History Room is "devoted to acquiring, preserving, and making available historically significant items concerning the history of the City of Carmel-by-the-Sea from its earliest days in the 1900s to present." 

Williams's daughter, Lacy Williams Buck and her husband Robert established an endowment for Henry Meade Williams Local History Room through the Frank H. and Eva Buck Foundation.

The Park Branch library features the Henry Meade Williams Lecture Series,'' that are lectures on the history of Mary Austin, Robinson Jeffers, Theatre of the Golden Bough, and more. The lobby of the Park Branch includes a display case with exhibits about these lectures.

See also
Timeline of Carmel-by-the-Sea, California

References

External links
 Henry Meade Williams Local History Lecture Series: Robinson & Una Jeffers “Our Inevitable Place”
 Henry Meade Williams Local History Lecture Series: Bohemian Soul
 Henry Meade Williams Local History Department

1899 births
1984 deaths
People from California
People from New York City